Meredith McGrath (born April 28, 1971) is a former professional tennis player.

She was born in Midland, Michigan, and made her debut on the WTA Tour in 1988. In her eight-year professional career, Meredith achieved career-high world rankings of No. 18 in singles and No. 4 in doubles. She notched victories over such players as Martina Navratilova, Martina Hingis, Anna Kournikova, Jana Novotna, Gigi Fernandez and Mary Jo Fernandez. The pinnacle of her career came in reaching the singles semifinals and doubles finals at the 1996 Wimbledon Championships (leading 7–5, 5–2 in the doubles final before losing to Suková/Hingis). In the singles, she defeated Mana Endo, Amanda Coetzer, Nancy Feber, Katarína Studeníková and Mary Joe Fernandez before losing to Arantxa Sánchez Vicario. An injury two weeks prior to the 1996 Wimbledon Championships eventually ended her career. Meredith won the 1995 US Open Mixed-Doubles Championship (she was runner-up in 1989) and was the runner-up in the 1994 Australian Open Doubles Championship. Meredith won three WTA singles titles, Oklahoma City and Eastbourne in 1994 and Birmingham in 1996, and 25 doubles titles. Meredith was recognized by Tennis Magazine as the WTA Comeback Player of the Year as she overcame near career-ending injuries to having her most successful competitive season in 1996. In 1994, she was awarded the WTA Tour Comeback Player of the Year.

Meredith played her collegiate tennis at Stanford University where she, during her only collegiate season, earned All-American honors in both singles and doubles after having achieved year-end rankings of No. 2 in singles and No. 1 in doubles (undefeated). She had maintained No. 1 rankings in both singles and doubles during her freshman year until a loss at the NCAA Championships. Meredith turned professional after her freshman year, but returned to Stanford to earn her degree in 2000 after injuries forced her early retirement. In 1990, Meredith was awarded the Block S Award for the Most Outstanding Freshman Athlete at Stanford and with her doubles partner, Teri Whitlinger, was named the Volvo Tennis/Tennis Magazine Doubles Team of the Year.

Meredith McGrath is also a 2012 inductee into the prestigious Stanford Hall of Fame. She is also a member of the USTA Midwest Hall of Fame and the USTA NorCal Hall of Fame.

As the No. 1 ranked junior player in the world, McGrath won a total of 19 national and international junior titles. She captured the US Open junior doubles title and Wimbledon junior doubles title with Jennifer Capriati in 1989, and won the US Open junior doubles title with Kimberly Po in 1987 and 1988. Meredith was the runner-up in the 1988 Wimbledon junior singles championship. A three-time national All-American in high school, Meredith won three Michigan High School Division A State Championships. She also received six USTA National Championship Sportsmanship Awards.

WTA career finals

Singles: 3 (3 titles)

Doubles: 38 (25 titles, 13 runner-ups)

Mixed doubles: 2 (1 title, 1 runner-up)

ITF finals

Singles (1–3)

Doubles (2–3)

Grand Slam doubles performance timeline

External links
 
 

American female tennis players
Sportspeople from Midland, Michigan
Tennis people from Michigan
United States National champions (tennis)
Stanford Cardinal women's tennis players
Wimbledon champions (pre-Open Era)
1971 births
Living people
Wimbledon junior champions
US Open (tennis) junior champions
Grand Slam (tennis) champions in mixed doubles
Grand Slam (tennis) champions in girls' doubles
US Open (tennis) champions